Oyne is a small village in rural Aberdeenshire at the bottom of Bennachie in Scotland.

Locality
The village has limited local resources. The area is popular with commuters to Inverurie/Huntly/Aberdeen. The area has a number of large private houses such as Westhall House, which was a small hotel until the 1990s. The Horn family were lairds of Westhall.

Oyne is set on a landscape of mountains right at its doorstep.

Oyne also has a café and shop called "Touched by Scotland". Selling souvenirs and snacks, all the goods made in the shop and café are either locally grown or home made.

Oyne School is in the centre of the village of Oyne, is non-denominational and the catchment area is the village of Oyne and the surrounding rural area.  The school's current pupil roll numbers in the 50s. The main school building dates back to 1874 but has been substantially modernised and extended to provide the current 3 teacher accommodation.  The school has an extensive playing field to the rear of the building.

Harthill Castle

Of note is the ancient seat of the family of Leith of Harthill, Harthill Castle (sometimes called 'Torries'), which stands close to the parish church. It dates from at least the 15th century and was extensively restored in 1638 by John Leith, the "violent laird". The castle was set on fire in the late 17th century, possible by John's son, Patrick Leith, to prevent it from falling into the hands of Leith creditors. It stood as a ruin for the next 300 years.

Ann Tweedy Savage purchased the castle in 1975 and with Slessor Troup, one of the area's top master masons, restored it between 1975 and 1977. The restoration work won the Saltire Award in 1977.

Harthill Castle is a pink-washed Z-plan twin-tower building, seven storeys high, made of solid granite, and set in woodland and farmland in Oyne at the foot of Bennachie. The ground floor is vaulted and has arrow slits and musket holes for windows. The next two storeys are partially vaulted. There are circular staircases in each tower, each rising counter-clockwise. The Great Hall has a  fireplace that predates the building and was probably brought to the property by the Leiths from their previous home.

References

 Bickley, Francis, The Leiths of Harthill, London, 1937.

Villages in Aberdeenshire